Satyam Shivam Sundaram is a 1978 Indian Hindi-language romantic drama film produced and directed by Raj Kapoor and written by Jainendra Jain, starring Shashi Kapoor and Zeenat Aman. The film's original soundtrack was composed by Laxmikant–Pyarelal. It is a social drama about the differences between physical and spiritual love. Satyam Shivam Sundaram was released on 24 March 1978 on the day of Holi. The film was dedicated to the iconic playback singer Mukesh, who was the voice of Raj Kapoor in many films. He died two years before the film's release and his last recorded song was part of this movie.

Plot 

The story is set in a village where Roopa lives with her father, the village priest. As a child, the right side of Roopa's face and neck were burned by a pot of boiling oil, leaving part of her face disfigured. Henceforth, Roopa keeps her right cheek hidden under the veil of her sari. Despite the terrible accident, Roopa remains religious and goes to the village temple daily, singing hymns and devotional songs.

Rajeev is a dashing engineer who arrives in the village to oversee the operation of a major dam. He abhors anything ugly. He hears Roopa's lovely singing and meets her, but does not see her disfigured side, and falls in love with her. He then asks her father's permission to marry her. Rupa does not want to cheat Rajeev because she loves him deeply and first request his father to reject the marriage proposal. But everyone from the village requests her to change her mind and thereby she agreed to marry Rajeev thinking he may accept her with her condition as he claimed to love her truly.

After the wedding, Rajeev discovers the truth and thinks that he was cheated and forced to marry someone else, at which point he disowns Roopa and drives her out of the house. Rajeev roams around the village on the wedding night in search of another Roopa, as he thinks there is another girl with the same name, waiting for him. On the other side, after being rejected by Rajeev on their wedding night, Roopa decided to commit suicide but was rescued by Rajeev, when he thought he found the girl he fall in love with, not his wife. After being rescued, Roopa decides to meet him at night, using a veil to hide the scarred side of her face. Rajeev spends his days ignoring his wife, and his nights loving his mistress, not knowing they are both the same woman.

During one of their nights together, they make love and Roopa gets pregnant. When Rajeev finds out that his wife is pregnant, he accuses her of infidelity and refuses to believe that his "mistress" and wife are the same. He publicly shames her and sends her back to her home. Seeing it, Roopa's father dies out of agony. Roopa vows that she will never ever return to Rajeev as his mistress.

A terrible storm ravages the village, breaking open the dam which Rajeev had come to repair. The village is being evacuated as the dam's shutters are opening. In the swirling waters of the flood, Rajeev sees how shallow he has been, and saves Roopa from drowning. He now realizes both are the same person, asks for Roopa's forgiveness, and accepts Roopa as his wife.

Cast 

 Shashi Kapoor as Rajeev, a civil engineer
 Zeenat Aman as Roopa, a village girl
 Padmini Kolhapure as Young Roopa
 Kanhaiyalal as Pandit Shyam Sunder, village priest
 A. K. Hangal as Bansi, Roopa's uncle
 Hari Shivdasani as Chief Engineer
 David Abraham Cheulkar as Bade Babu
 Leela Chitnis as Bade Babu's wife
 Vishwa Mehra as Jai Singh
 Sheetal as Champa
 Monika as Roopa's friend
 Subroto Mahapatra as Shastry, Roopa's prospective father-in-law
 Javed Khan as Shastry's son
 Tun Tun as Fat Lady

Production 
In her book Raj Kapoor Speaks, Ritu Nanda reveals that Lata Mangeshkar was the inspiration behind the film and that he wanted to cast her in the movie; "I visualised the story of a man falling for a woman with an ordinary face but a golden voice and wanted to cast Lata Mangeshkar in the role, the book quotes Raj Kapoor as saying." Before Zeenat Aman was cast in the role, Hema Malini, Dimple Kapadia, Vidya Sinha were offered the role, but they refused because of sensual content and body exposure in the film. Rajesh Khanna was almost offered the male lead role in the film, but Raj Kapoor was later convinced to cast Shashi Kapoor instead.

Although Aman's breasts were exposed by having her wear a transparent, wet white sari, qualifying it for a restrictive rating, the Central Board of Film Certification issued a U (Universal) certificate for the film.

Kumar Gaurav (son of veteran actor Rajendra Kumar) was an assistant director on the film. He was credited as "Manoj Kumar".

Music 

Laxmikant–Pyarelal's music won the Filmfare Best Music Director Award. Lata Mangeshkar lends her voice to the main theme song "Satyam Shivam Sundaram", which was among the chart-toppers of the year, and remains a chartbuster. Various recent music groups from both India and the United States, such as Thievery Corporation and Sheila Chandra, have re-done the theme song from the movie. Also, many variations of the song have been made (e.g. the original version is considered, in Indian music, a Bhajan, but Lata Mangeshkar has also made a bhangra-like version, a different style). The song "Chanchal Sheetal Nirmal Komal" was the last song of the popular singer Mukesh, who died soon after recording the song. Raj Kapoor dedicated the film to him.

Mangeshkar at the time of recording the main theme song was in dispute that the initial selected Music Director was her brother Hridaynath Mangeshkar but he was replaced with Laxmikant Pyarelal overnight. She has conveyed that she came for the recording, practiced the song for a short while, sang the song in anger in one take, and left. This was her one of the song recorded in not more than 30 minutes.

 "Satyam Shivam Sundaram" was listed at #6 on Binaca Geetmala annual list 1977
 "Yashomati Maiya Se" was listed at #7 on Binaca Geetmala annual list 1978
 "Chanchal Sheetal Nirmal Komal" was listed at #24 on Binaca Geetmala annual list 1978

Rakesh Budhu of Planet Bollywood gave 9 stars stating, "Satyam Shivam Sundaram is still a soundtrack that shines more amidst L-P's many melody accomplishments."

Accolades 
26th Filmfare Awards:
Won
 Best Music Director – Laxmikant–Pyarelal
 Best Cinematography – Radhu Karmakar

Nominated
 Best Director – Raj Kapoor
 Best Actress – Zeenat Aman
 Best Lyricist – Pandit Narendra Sharma for "Satyam Shivam Sundaram"
 Best Male Playback Singer – Mukesh for "Chanchal Sheetal" (posthumous)

Controversy 

The film's exhibition was challenged by a man named Laxman from Himachal Pradesh. A prosecution u/s 292 of the Indian Penal Code was lodged against Raj Kapoor for promoting 'Obscenity' through the Film. The local Magistrate Court took cognisance and summons/notice was issued to Mr. Raj Kapoor. The notice was challenged by Mr. Kapoor before the High Court but the High Court did not interfere. Kapoor then approached the Hon'ble Supreme Court. Justice found merit in the contention of the Filmmaker and quashed the prosecution at the threshold. Once a certificate u/s 5. A of the Film Certification Act was granted, the Filmmaker would be covered by the protection u/s 79 of the Indian Penal Code which states, "Nothing is an offence which is done by any person who is justified by law, or who because of a mistake of fact and not because of a mistake of law in good faith, believes himself to be justified by law, in doing it." Justice Iyer in the concluding paragraph has made following observation highlighting the responsibility of the Censor Board, "And the Board, alive to its public duty, shall not play to the gallery; nor shall it restrain aesthetic expression and progressive art through obsolete norms and grandma inhibition when the world is wheeling forward to glimpse the beauty of creation in its myriad manifestations and liberal horizons, A happy balance is to maintained."

References

External links 
 

1978 films
1970s Hindi-language films
Films directed by Raj Kapoor
Films scored by Laxmikant–Pyarelal
Indian erotic drama films
R. K. Films films
1970s erotic drama films
1978 drama films